Analytics is the systematic computational analysis of data or statistics.

Analytics may also refer to:
 Analytics (ice hockey), the analysis of the characteristics of hockey players and teams through the use of statistics and other tools
 Analytics (basketball), analyzing basketball statistics through objective evidence
 Adobe Analytics, part of Adobe Experience Cloud
 Google Analytics, a web analytics service offered by Google

See also
 Analytic (disambiguation)
 Prior Analytics, a treatise by Aristotle
 Posterior Analytics, a treatise by Aristotle